Sarid can refer to:

Sarid, a land allotted to the tribe of Zebulun (Joshua 19:10), and later a Biblical city
Sarid, a kibbutz in the Jezreel Valley, established in 1926
Yishai Sarid (1965–), Israeli attorney and author
Yossi Sarid (1940–2015), left-wing Israeli news commentator and former Minister of Education of Israel
Ein Sarid, a village in central Israel